Ernst-Eberhard Hell (19 September 1887 – 15 September 1973) was a German general in the Wehrmacht during World War II. He commanded several divisions and later an army corps. He was a recipient of the  Knight's Cross of the Iron Cross with Oak Leaves of Nazi Germany.

Hell surrendered to the Soviet forces in August 1944 during the Soviet Jassy–Kishinev Offensive (August 1944). He was held in the Soviet Union as a war criminal until 1955.

Awards and decorations
 Iron Cross (1914) 2nd Class (11 September 1914) & 1st Class
 Military Merit Order, 4th class with Swords (Bavaria)
 Military Merit Cross, 3rd class with War Decoration (Austria-Hungary)
 Silver Liakat Medal with Sabres
 Ottoman War Medal (Turkish: Harp Madalyası; "Gallipoli Star", "Iron Crescent")
 Clasp to the Iron Cross (1939) 2nd Class (12 May 1940) & 1st Class (17 May 1940)
 German Cross in Gold on 14 June 1942 as General der Artillerie and commander of VII Army Corps
 Knight's Cross of the Iron Cross with Oak Leaves
 Knight's Cross on 1 February 1943 as General der Artillerie and commander of VII Army Corps
 400th Oak Leaves on 4 June 1944 as General der Artillerie and commander of VII Army Corps

References

Citations

Bibliography

 
 
 
 

1887 births
1973 deaths
People from Stade
People from the Province of Hanover
Generals of Artillery (Wehrmacht)
Reichswehr personnel
German Army personnel of World War I
Recipients of the clasp to the Iron Cross, 1st class
Recipients of the Gold German Cross
Recipients of the Knight's Cross of the Iron Cross with Oak Leaves
Recipients of the Silver Liakat Medal
German prisoners of war in World War II held by the Soviet Union
Prussian Army personnel
Military personnel from Lower Saxony
Recipients of the Liakat Medal
German Army generals of World War II